Siah Kalan or Siyah Kalan may refer to:
 Siah Kalan, Alborz
 Siah Kalan, East Azerbaijan